Lower Wattle Grove is a rural locality in the local government area of Huon Valley in the South-east region of Tasmania. The 2016 census has a population of 89 for the state suburb of Lower Wattle Grove.

History
Lower Wattle Grove was gazetted as a locality in 1971.

Geography
The shore of the Huon River estuary forms the western boundary.

Road infrastructure
The C639 route (Cygnet Coast Road) enters from the north-west and follows the Huon River to the south-west, where it exits. Route C641 (Silver Hill Road) starts at an intersection with C639 in the north-west and runs east through the locality until it exits in the north-east.

References

Localities of Huon Valley Council
Towns in Tasmania